Thomas Keith Chadwick is retired officer in the United States Navy and former Chaplain of the United States Coast Guard.

Biography
A native of Ohio, Chadwick is an ordained Presbyterian minister. Chadwick is a graduate of Ohio University, Pittsburgh Theological Seminary and Pepperdine University. He is married with three sons and six grandchildren: William, Callum, Wesley, Natalie, Caroline and Alexander.

Career
Chadwick was commissioned a Navy chaplain candidate in 1971 and entered active duty in 1975. His promotion to Captain was approved in 1991. Chadwick held the position of Chaplain of the United States Coast Guard from 1992 to 1995 before retiring in 1998.

Awards he received include the Legion of Merit, the Meritorious Service Medal with award star, the Navy Commendation Medal with two award stars, the Coast Guard Commendation Medal and the Lifesaving Medal.

References

1949 births
Living people
People from Athens, Ohio
Ohio University alumni
Pepperdine University alumni
Pittsburgh Theological Seminary alumni
American Presbyterian ministers
United States Navy officers
United States Navy chaplains
Chaplains of the United States Coast Guard
Recipients of the Legion of Merit